Helge Stalsberg (born 7 October 1932) was a Norwegian physician.

He was born in Oslo. He was chief physician of the University Hospital of North Norway, and professor of morphology at the University of Tromsø from 1972. He served as rector from 1981 to 1985. He has also been a consultant for the World Health Organization.

References

1932 births
Living people
20th-century Norwegian physicians
Academic staff of the University of Tromsø
Rectors of the University of Tromsø